Steve Mason (1940 in Brooklyn, New York – May 25, 2005) was a decorated United States Army captain, combat veteran of the Vietnam War, critically acclaimed poet and the Poet Laureate of the Vietnam Veterans of America.

Poetry 
Mason's poem "The Wall Within" was read at the 1984 dedication of the Vietnam Veterans Memorial in Washington, D.C. and has the distinction of being the only American work of poetry on display at the war memorial in Hanoi. The author of four books, his poetry related to his experiences as a captain in the United States Army during the Vietnam War. His work was hailed by veterans and their families nationwide.

Diagnosed with lung cancer as a result of exposure to Agent Orange during the war, he became a participant and active advocate for the Oregon Death with Dignity Act, and spoke at the California State Assembly for a similar law proposed in that state. He died at his home in Ashland, Oregon, at the age of 65. He is survived by four children.

Mason once said, "The truth is, that the only message I`ve taken from war, is peace.``

Bibliography 
 The Moths & Violets of Vito & Me: The Story of a Poem  
 Johnny's Song: Poetry of a Vietnam Veteran  
 Warrior for Peace   
 The Human Being: A Warrior's Journey Toward Peace and Mutual Healing

References

External links

Washington Post article on death
The Wall Within, the signature poem of Steve Mason, which he delivered at the dedication of the Vietnam War Memorial

Class Page for the U.S. Army Signal Corps OCS class that Steve Mason graduated from. Shows close friends and fellow graduates of Steve as he trained to become an Army Signal Corps Second Lieutenant. Class picture on this page shows Steve as an OCS Candidate.

1940 births
2005 deaths
Deaths from lung cancer
Poets from Oregon
United States Army personnel of the Vietnam War
United States Army officers
Writers from Ashland, Oregon
Deaths from cancer in Oregon
20th-century American poets
Military personnel from Oregon